Mandla District is a district of Madhya Pradesh in central India. The town of Mandla is the administrative headquarters of the district. It is part of Jabalpur Division.

The district has an area of 8771 km², and a population of 779,414. It has 9 development blocks, 6 tehsils, and 1214 villages.  It lies in the Mahakoshal region, and most of the district lies in the basin of the Narmada River.

Economy
In 2006 the Ministry of Panchayati Raj named Mandla one of the country's 250 most backward districts (out of a total of 640). It is one of the 24 districts in Madhya Pradesh currently receiving funds from the Backward Regions Grant Fund Programme (BRGF).

Demographics

According to the 2011 census Mandla District has a population of 1,054,905, roughly equal to the nation of Cyprus or the US state of Rhode Island. This gives it a ranking of 432nd in India (out of a total of 640). Its population growth rate over the decade 2001-2011 was  17.81%. Mandla has a sex ratio of 1005 females for every 1000 males, and a literacy rate of 68.28%. 12.34% of the population lives in urban areas. Scheduled Castes and Scheduled Tribes make up 4.69% and 57.88% of the population respectively. Gonds are the largest Scheduled Tribe with over 50% of the district's population.

Languages

At the time of the 2011 Census of India, 88.67% of the population in the district spoke Hindi and 10.22% Gondi as their first language. The dialect of the region is a central Indo-Aryan dialect closely related to Chhattisgarhi.

Ecology
Much of the district is forested, and it is home to Kanha National Park, a Project Tiger sanctuary. Kanha has the largest number of tigers in India. The park has won national awards for good management and infrastructure. The park is open year round except for July and August. The district is also home to Mandla Plant Fossils National Park.
However, once upon a time Kanha and Satpura forest region, now famous as tiger reserves, were ruled by wild Indian elephants and lions.

Villages
 

Bineka

References

External links

Mandla District web site

 
Districts of Madhya Pradesh